Chen Gene-tzn (born 1 July 1941) or Johnson Chen is a Taiwanese lawyer and politician.

Chen studied law at National Taiwan University and practiced law for two decades, which encompassed tenures as a prosecutor before the district courts in Taipei and Kaohsiung. Aside from law, Chen taught at schools in Hualien was also active in Christian welfare and social services organizations. He later chaired the Taishin Investment Trust.

He served on the second convocation of the National Assembly before being elected to consecutive terms as a member of the Legislative Yuan in 1995 and 1998 on the Kuomintang proportional representation party list. While serving on the Legislative Yuan, he was also a member of the Kuomintang's standing committee and director of the party's organizational affairs department.

References

1941 births
Living people
Party List Members of the Legislative Yuan
Kuomintang Members of the Legislative Yuan in Taiwan
Members of the 3rd Legislative Yuan
Members of the 4th Legislative Yuan
National Taiwan University alumni
Taiwanese business executives
Taiwanese schoolteachers
20th-century Taiwanese educators
20th-century Taiwanese lawyers